Telecogresca is the Telecom BCN's annual festival and known to be the largest university festival in Spain.

History 
The first Telecogresca took place on December 1, 1978, to celebrate the construction of the new building of the university in the street Jordi Girona. On that first occasion, the party took place in the school itself with a remarkable participation, while putting the first stone of what that nowadays it is.

Nowadays, it is known as a 'music festival' organized by volunteers with more than 10,000 attendees per edition. All benefits from the party are invested in the next year, so no profit is obtained. "Telecogresca" can also be used to refer to the non-profit student association that organizes the festival.

References

External links
 Telecom BCN Web
 Telecogresca's website in 

Education in Barcelona